A number of steamships were named Paris City, including –

, a British cargo ship in service 1920–37
, a British cargo ship in service 1946–54

Ship names